Blow in the Wind is the third album by Me First and the Gimme Gimmes, released in 2001, on the Fat Wreck Chords independent record label.  Blow in the Wind features several tracks which are led off with musical mash-ups of, or homages to, classic Punk songs, a trend the group began on their second album, Are a Drag (with an appropriation of "Generator" by Bad Religion for their cover of "My Favorite Things") and would continue with Take a Break and Ruin Jonny's Bar Mitzvah: "Sloop John B" samples "Teenage Lobotomy" by The Ramones, "Elenor" samples "London Calling" by The Clash, "San Francisco" samples "Stranger Than Fiction" by Bad Religion, "I Only Want To Be With You" samples and "The Money Will Roll Right In" by Fang. Similarly, the track "Different Drum" also ends with a guitar riff taken from "Georgy Girl" by the Seekers.

The first song begins with a clip similar to the hidden track on the NOFX album Punk in Drublic where Fat Mike attempts to find the proper pitch of the word "how" in the line "How did the cat get so fat?" from "Perfect Government".

The album is made up entirely of "Hits of the 1960s". The band's version of "Different Drum" can be heard during the credits of the film Dodgeball: A True Underdog Story.

The band's version of 'Sloop John B' is featured in the film The Wolf of Wall Street.

Track listing

Personnel
 Spike Slawson - vocals
 Chris Shiflett (a.k.a. Jake Jackson) - lead guitar
 Joey Cape - rhythm guitar
 Fat Mike - bass
 Dave Raun - drums

References 

2001 albums
Me First and the Gimme Gimmes albums
Fat Wreck Chords albums